Pseudagkistrodon is a monotypic genus of snakes in the family Colubridae. The sole species is Pseudagkistrodon rudis, also known as red keelback, false habu, and false viper.  It is found in southwest, south, and east China and in Taiwan. One subspecies, Pseudagkistrodon rudis multiprefrontalis Zhao and Jiang 1981 from Sichuan, is recognized, in addition to the nominotypical one.

Description
Pseudagkistrodon rudis appears to mimic vipers, and the head takes a triangular shape when the snake takes a defensive position. 

The head is broad and distinct from the neck. The dorsum is brown to grey brown, sometimes tinted with bronze, and interrupted by dark patterns of variable in size, disposition and intensity of pigmentation.

Female snakes give birth to 12–27 young per litter in late summer and autumn. The newly hatched young measure  cm in total length.

Habitat and conservation
Pseudagkistrodon rudis is a common species that inhabits montane meadows, riparian areas of brooks, valleys, road sides, shrubs, and rock piles.

The species is traded in significant numbers, which might present a localized threat. However, the overall population of this widespread species is stable and its conservation status  is assessed as "Least Concern".

References 

Natricinae
Snakes of China
Reptiles of Taiwan
Taxa named by John Van Denburgh
Monotypic snake genera